The Roman Catholic Diocese of Ourinhos is a diocese located in the city of Ourinhos in the Ecclesiastical province of Botucatu in Brazil.

History
 December 30, 1998: Established as Diocese of Ourinhos from the Diocese of Assis, Metropolitan Archdiocese of Botucatu and Diocese of Itapeva

Leadership
 Bishops of Ourinhos (Roman rite)
 Bishop Salvatore Paruzzo (December 30, 1998 – May 19, 2021)
 Bishop Eduardo Vieira dos Santos (May 19, 2021 – present)

Sources
 GCatholic.org
 Catholic Hierarchy

Roman Catholic dioceses in Brazil
Christian organizations established in 1998
Ourinhos, Roman Catholic Diocese of
Roman Catholic dioceses and prelatures established in the 20th century